Ma Shuli (born 20 January 1978) is a Chinese discus thrower.

Her personal best throw is 62.50 metres, achieved in April 2005 in Zhongshan. The Chinese, and Asian, record is currently held by Xiao Yanling with 71.68 metres.

Achievements

References
Sources

Notes

1978 births
Living people
Chinese female discus throwers
Asian Games medalists in athletics (track and field)
Athletes (track and field) at the 2002 Asian Games
Asian Games bronze medalists for China
Medalists at the 2002 Asian Games